The Utah Test and Training Range (UTTR) is a Department of Defense military testing and training area located in Utah's West Desert, approximately  west of Salt Lake City, Utah. UTTR is currently the largest contiguous block of over-land supersonic-authorized restricted airspace in the contiguous United States. Interstate 80 divides the two sections of the range. The site is administered and maintained by the United States Air Force (USAF) HQ UTTR, formerly known as the 388th Range Squadron (388RANS) stationed at Hill Air Force Base, Utah.

History
The Wendover Army Air Field was created in 1942 for research and training, with testing of Republic-Ford JB-2 (U.S. copy of the V-1 flying bomb) in 1945-1946, the Matador in the 1950s, and Minuteman motor testing and development in the 1960s. Wendover property was split and transferred to the nearby city, but land for the test range was kept, becoming the Utah Test and Training Range in 1979 under the Air Force Systems Command.

Activities

Military
The Utah Test and Training Range (UTTR) is host to a variety of training and testing missions for the USAF, United States Army, and United States Marine Corps. The site is frequently used for the disposal of explosive ordnance, testing of experimental military equipment, as well as ground and air military training exercises. The UTTR works in close conjunction with Dugway Proving Ground (DPG) for military training exercises.

Space
The site has also been used as a landing site for sample return in NASA's planetary science missions, including comet material in the Stardust mission and the upcoming OSIRIS-REx mission to return material from an asteroid.

UTTR was also used as the landing site for the Genesis sample return mission. Although the sample return capsule's parachute failed to open and the capsule made a hard landing in the soft sandy soil, most of the collected scientific materials were salvaged. The solar wind particle collectors were made of wafers of aluminum, sapphire, silicon, germanium, gold and diamond-like amorphous carbon. When the capsule hit the desert floor, these wafers shattered into over 10,000 pieces of material. The Genesis team, along with the efforts of the USAF's Photographic and Engineering Technician team, set up a clean room at Dugway Proving Ground. NASA scientists spent months filtering through bent metal and shards of razor sharp material, each of the salvageable pieces of material going into its own small container where they were stored for a short time. Some weeks later, one of the lead scientists and the supervisor of the engineering technicians came upon what turned out to be the solar wind concentrator. Protected by a couple of aluminum braces and brackets, the concentrator had survived almost completely intact with only one small crack in one of its quadrants.

See also
 Tekoi
 Nevada Test and Training Range
 Space Test and Training Range
 Naval Air Weapons Station China Lake

References

Great Salt Lake Desert
Buildings and structures in Box Elder County, Utah
Buildings and structures in Tooele County, Utah
Ranges of the United States Air Force
Military installations in Utah